The Pyronemataceae are a family of fungi in the order Pezizales. It is the largest family of the Pezizales, encompassing 75 genera and approximately 500 species. Phylogenetic analyses does not support the prior classifications of this family,  and suggest that the family is not monophyletic as it is currently circumscribed.

Morphology
Members of the family are diverse in ascomatal or cleistothecial form. Individual taxa may be sessile (without a stipe) to shortly stipitate, cupulate (cup-shaped), discoid (disc-shaped), pulvinate (cushion-shaped), or with turbinate (turban-shaped) epigeous apothecia. Also, taxa may be sub-hypogeous to hypogeous with closed, folded, or solid ascomata. Apothecia may range in size from less than 1 mm up to 12 cm in diameter, and may be brightly colored due to carotenoid pigments. Genera of the Pyronemataceae lack unifying macroscopic or microscopic characteristics; this lack of uniting characters has led various authors to propose a variety of classification schemes.

Genera

This list of genera in the family Pyronemataceae. The genus name is followed by the author citation, year of publication, and number of species.

Acervus  – 9 spp.
Aleuria  – ca. 10 spp.
Aleurina  – ca. 10 spp.
Anthracobia  – ca. 10 spp.
Aparaphysaria  – 2 spp.
Arpinia  – 4 spp.
Ascocalathium  – 1 sp.
Ascosparassis  – 1 sp.
Aurantiolachnea  – 1 sp.
Boubovia  – 7 spp.
Byssonectria  – 7 spp.
Boudierella  – 1 sp.
Chaetothiersia  – 1 sp.
Chalazion  – 3 spp.
Cheilymenia  – 67 spp.
Cupulina  – 2 spp.
Dictyocoprotus  – 1 sp.
Eoaleurina  – 1 sp.
Galeoscypha  – 1 sp.
Genabea  – 5 spp.
Genea  – ca. 40 spp.
Geneosperma  – 2 spp.
Geopora  – ca. 20 spp.
Geopyxis  – 
Gilkeya  – 1 sp.
Hiemsia  – 2 spp.
Hoffmannoscypha Stielow, Göker & Klenk (2012) – 1 sp.
Humaria  – ca. 10 spp.
Hydnocystis  – 7 spp.
Hypotarzetta  – 1 spp.
Jafnea  – 2 spp.
Lamprospora  – ca. 50 spp.
Lasiobolidium  – 13
Lasiocupulina  – 1 sp.
Lathraeodiscus  – 1 sp.
Lazuardia  – 1 sp.
Leucoscypha  – 10 spp.
Lotinia  – 1 sp.
Luciotrichus  – 1 sp.
Melastiza  – ca. 10 spp.
Micronematobotrys  – 1 sp.
Miladina  – 1 sp.
Monascella  – 1 sp.
Moravecia  – 2 spp.
Mycogalopsis  – 1 sp.
Neottiella  – ca. 5 spp.
Nothojafnea  – 2 spp.
Octospora  – ca. 50 spp.
Octosporella  – 16 spp.
Orbicula  – 2 spp.
Otidea  – ca. 52 spp.
Oviascoma  – 1 sp.
Parascutellinia  – 6 spp.
Paratricharina  – 1 sp.
Paratrichophaea  – 5 spp.
Parawilcoxina  – 1 sp.
Paurocotylis  – 8 spp.
Perilachnea  – 6 spp.
Petchiomyces  – 1 sp.
Picoa  – 2 spp.
Planamyces  – 1 sp.
Pseudaleuria  – 2 spp.
Pseudotricharina  – 3 spp.
Pulvinula  – 26 spp.
Pyronema  – 3 spp.
Pyropyxis  – 1 sp.
Ramsbottomia  – 3 spp.
Rhizoblepharia  – 2 spp.
Rhodoscypha  – 1 sp.
Rhodotarzetta  – 2 spp.
Scutellinia  – 70 spp.
Selenaspora  – 1 sp.
Sepultariella  – 2 spp.
Smardaea  – 9 spp.
Smarodsia  – 1 sp.
Sowerbyella  – 17 spp.
Sphaerosoma  – 11 spp.
Sphaerosporella  – 3 spp.
Spooneromyces  – 5 spp.
Tricharina  – 12 spp.
Trichophaea  – 26 spp.
Trichophaeopsis  – 4 spp.
Wenyingia  – 1 sp.
Wilcoxina  – 5 spp.

References

 
Ascomycota families
Taxa described in 1842
Taxa named by August Carl Joseph Corda